The 1993 Liège–Bastogne–Liège was the 79th edition of the Liège–Bastogne–Liège cycle race and was held on 18 April 1993. The race started in Liège and finished in Ans. The race was won by Rolf Sørensen of the Carrera team.

General classification

References

1993
1993 in Belgian sport
Liege-Bastogne-Liege
April 1993 sports events in Europe
1993 in road cycling